Kopp's Frozen Custard is a restaurant chain located in the Milwaukee, Wisconsin area. It specializes in frozen custard and large "jumbo" hamburgers. Founded by Elsa Kopp in 1950, the restaurants continue to be heralded by local publications for their quality food. They have locations in three Milwaukee suburbs—Greenfield, Brookfield, and Glendale.

Kopp's was the first custard stand to offer a special "flavor of the day" in addition to the more traditional chocolate and vanilla flavors.

History

Founding
Elsa Kopp opened the first Kopp's stand at 6005 W. Appleton Ave., Milwaukee, Wisconsin (now the site of JJ Fish & Chicken) in 1950. A German immigrant with no prior business experience, Kopp started the stand after her husband, Karl Kopp, developed Parkinson's disease. Some support in starting the business came from Leon Schneider, a custard machine repairman (the founder of Leon's Frozen Custard in 1942), whom Elsa Kopp had met while working at a bakery.

The Kopp's frozen custard stand rose in popularity quickly during the 1950s and was soon seen as a Milwaukee staple. By 1960 the Kopp's stand was successful enough that Elsa felt comfortable experimenting with more exotic frozen custard recipes.  Initially she mixed chocolate and vanilla, a controversial act in the early frozen custard community.  After this, Kopp's began offering increasingly diverse concoctions which became their well known "flavor of the day" menu option. Kopp's offers two unique flavors every day and a featured shake and sundae of the month. The featured flavors are often related to events for that day or month.

The Glendale location (5373 N. Port Washington Ave.) is on the site of the former Milky Way drive-in restaurant, the inspiration for the external look of the Happy Days diner, Arnold's Drive-In.

Kopp's is now owned by Elsa's son, Karl Kopp, who also owns Elsa's on the Park on Jefferson Street in downtown Milwaukee, which opened New Year's Eve of 1980. He has also opened restaurants in Arizona and New York. Each location prominently displays a portrait of Elsa Kopp.

In September 2004, Vice President Dick Cheney made an unannounced visit to a Kopp's Frozen Custard location while campaigning for his and George W. Bush's reelection.

Joe Biden visit
In June 2010, Vice President Joe Biden visited a Kopp's Frozen Custard location while campaigning for Democratic senator Russ Feingold. Biden asked Scott Borkin, the manager of Kopp's, what he owed for his custard. In response, Borkin joked, "Don’t worry; it’s on the house. Lower our taxes and we’ll call it even." In response, Biden came back later to the manager and said, "Why don’t you say something nice instead of being a smartass all the time?" Just a couple minutes after that interaction, Biden approached the manager again and apologized, saying that he was just kidding. Borkin appeared on Fox & Friends to discuss the incident, which was covered by local and other national news agencies.

See also
 List of frozen custard companies

References

Further reading

External links 
 

Companies based in Milwaukee
Restaurants in Wisconsin
Privately held companies based in Wisconsin
Restaurants established in 1950
Frozen custard
Ice cream parlors in the United States
1950 establishments in Wisconsin
Family-owned companies of the United States